The Edmund Blinn House is located in Pasadena, Los Angeles County, California.  It was listed on the National Register of Historic Places in 2001.

History
The Blinn House was designed in the Prairie School style by architect George Washington Maher, a follower of Louis H. Sullivan and a contemporary of Frank Lloyd Wright. The house was built in 1905, with an American Craftsman style attention to aesthetic integration.

Women's City Club
After it dissolved the previous year and after nearly 76 years in the house, the Women's City Club of Pasadena in 1921 gifted The Edmund Blinn House to Pasadena Heritage, who maintains its headquarters in the building.

See also
National Register of Historic Places listings in Pasadena, California
"George Washington Maher - architect of the Edmund Blinn House"

References

Buildings and structures on the National Register of Historic Places in Pasadena, California
Houses in Pasadena, California
Houses on the National Register of Historic Places in California
American Craftsman architecture in California
Houses completed in 1905
Prairie School architecture in California
1905 establishments in California